The County of Peebles may refer to:

 A historical name for the present-day Scottish county of Peeblesshire.
 County of Peebles (ship), a four-masted iron-hulled full-rig ship   launched in Glasgow, Scotland in July 1875.